The National Taiwan Sport University (NTSU) once a public university located in Taoyuan, Taichung and Chiayi County, Taiwan. It was created in 2008 through the merger of National College of Physical Education and Sports and National Taiwan College of Physical Education.

NTSU was the first case that Taiwan merged universities failed, but its English name and Chinese abbreviation still in use nowadays.

History 
 February 1, 2008: National College of Physical Education and Sports and National Taiwan College of Physical Education merging, all colleges and administrative unit remain the same, expected integrate with 4 years.
 March 2009: Ministry of Education (MOE) confirmed that NTUS sent the unmerge request, the school will split into two college later this year.
 August 2009: National College of Physical Education and Sports rename to National Taiwan Sport University in English, the same before unmerge, but Chinese name does not have Taiwan（）.
 December 2012: National Taiwan College of Physical Education rename to National Taiwan University of Physical Education (NTUPE), and use the Chinese abbreviation of NTSU（）.

Campuses 
NTSU has three campuses:
 Taoyuan Campus in Guishan, Taoyuan
 Taichung Campus in North District, Taichung
 Chiayi Campus in Puzi, Chiayi County

In preparations 
 Kaohsiung Campus in Zuoying District, Kaohsiung

Relevant articles 
 National Taiwan Sport University
 National Taiwan University of Sport

References 

Educational institutions established in 2008
2008 establishments in Taiwan
2009 disestablishments in Taiwan